Eve Barlow is a Scottish-American speaker and blogger based in Los Angeles. Raised in Glasgow, she was formerly Deputy Editor of the NME. Barlow is also known as a Jewish activist who advocates for Israel. 

At the request of Johnny Depp's legal team, Barlow was ejected from the Depp v. Heard trial.

References 

1986 births
Living people
Scottish Jews
Scottish feminists
Zionists
Scottish expatriates in the United States
Scottish bloggers
Scottish women bloggers
Jewish bloggers
British music journalists